We Three may refer to:
"We three", a personal pronoun in certain languages (See "we".)
We Three (aka Nous trois), a 1992 novel by Jean Echenoz
We Three (Roy Haynes album), a 1959 album by Roy Haynes with Phineas Newborn and Paul Chambers 
We Three (Stanley Cowell album), a 1989 album by Stanley Cowell with Frederick Waits and Buster Williams
"We Three (My Echo, My Shadow and Me)", 1940 song by Frank Sinatra and the Tommy Dorsey Orchestra 
"We Three", a song by the Patti Smith Group on the 1978 album  Easter
We Three, a band that appeared on The Monkees 1969 TV Special 33⅓ Revolutions per Monkee
We Three, a band appearing on America's Got Talent (season 13)
We Three, a songwriting team of Bettye Crutcher, Homer Davis, and Raymond Jackson